Protrinemuridae is a family of primitive insects belonging to the order Zygentoma. The family was previously classified as a subfamily of the Nicoletiidae, but raised to family level in 2002.

The family comprises four genera:

 Protrinemura Silvestri, 1942
 Protrinemurella Mendes, 2002
 Protrinemuroides Mendes, 2002
 Trinemophora Schaeffer, 1897

References

Zygentoma
Insect families